Squash is a popular sport in England. There is a long history of the sport in the country, and as of 2018 there are many highly ranked English players, both in men's and women's squash.

History of squash in England
England is where squash was invented. Students at Harrow School in London created the sport in 1830 when they discovered the potential that a small, punctured rubber ball had for yielding a game where a variety of shots were possible. Originally played in alleys and courtyards, the first purpose-built squash court was erected in Oxford in 1883.

Professional competitions
Many professional squash competitions take place in England each year.

PSA World Tour
The PSA World Tour calendar includes many professional tournaments held in England every year. The most prestigious of these are the British Open Squash Championships (PSA150) and the Canary Wharf Squash Classic (PSA70).

Premier Squash League
The Premier Squash League runs every year from October to April. Teams consist of 4 men and 1 woman. There are 2 geographical divions (North and South, formerly known as A and B) and towards the end of the season the top 2 clubs from each division progress to the semi-finals.

Top players

English squash players have been known to dominate the world rankings.

World number ones
England has produced several world number ones:
 Men:
 Lee Beachill
 Nick Matthew
 James Willstrop
 Women:
 Lisa Opie
 Cassie Jackman
 Laura Massaro

Highest ranked players
As of April 2018, the highest ranked English squash players were:
 Men:
 Nick Matthew (12)
 James Willstrop (14)
 Daryl Selby (19)
 Declan James (25)
 Tom Richards (33)
 Women:
 Laura Massaro (7)
 Sarah-Jane Perry (8)
 Alison Waters (10)
 Victoria Lust (15)
 Emily Whitlock (19)

National teams
England has national men's and women's teams, that represent the country in international competitions.

Commonwealth Games
England players compete in the squash events of the Commonwealth Games, which are held every 4 years. Most recently, in the 2018 games, English players James Willstrop and 
Sarah-Jane Perry won gold in the men's singles event and silver in the women's singles event respectively.

Governance
Squash in England is governed by England Squash.

Amateur level
At amateur level, each county in England has its own league with multiple divisions, where clubs affiliated to the county enter one or more teams.  Sport England statistics showed that 500,000 people regularly play squash in England, with 900 affiliated clubs and 4,500 squash courts across the country. The National Schools Championships was established in 1972 and has about 100 schools participating.

See also
Sport in England

References